Romania competed at the 2020 Summer Paralympics in Tokyo, Japan, from 24 August to 5 September 2021.

Medalists

Cycling 

Romania sent one cyclist after successfully getting a slot in the 2018 UCI Nations Ranking Allocation quota for the European.

Table tennis

Romania entered one athlete into the table tennis competition at the games. Bobi Simion qualified via World Ranking allocation.

Men

References 

2020
Nations at the 2020 Summer Paralympics
2021 in Romanian sport